Sa Pobla is a small municipality in the district of Raiguer on Majorca, one of the Balearic Islands.  It is a terminus on the Majorca rail network.

The town is in the north of the island. It comprises three very different areas: the Marjal, fertile plains in large part devoted to irrigated agriculture; l 'lagoon, a large area of scenic and ecological value where the streams and San Miguel de Muro (of Almadrà).

References

External links
Official website

 
Populated places in Mallorca